The Gaza Strip Super Cup  is the football super cup competition in the Gaza Strip of Palestine, played between the winners of the Gaza Strip Premier League and the Gaza Strip Cup.

Results

See also
Palestine Cup
West Bank Super Cup

References

External links
RSSSF.com

National association football supercups
Football competitions in the State of Palestine